Judge Taylor may refer to:

Alan Taylor (British judge) (born 1939),  Circuit Judge on the Midland Circuit
Anna Diggs Taylor (1932–2017), judge of the United States District Court for the Eastern District of Michigan
Fredrick Monroe Taylor (1901–1988), judge of the United States District Court for the District of Idaho
Gary L. Taylor (born 1938), judge of the United States District Court for the Central District of California
George Caldwell Taylor (1885–1952), judge of the United States District Court for the Eastern District of Tennessee
Robert Love Taylor (judge) (1899–1987), judge of the United States District Court for the Eastern District of Tennessee
Robert Walker Tayler (1852–1910), judge of the United States District Court for the Northern District of Ohio
William McLaughlin Taylor Jr. (1909–1985), judge of the United States District Court for the Northern District of Texas

See also
Justice Taylor (disambiguation)